The T65 (聯勤 Type 65) is a rifle developed and manufactured by the Combined Logistics Command of the Republic of China Armed Forces in Taiwan. Originally patterned after the Armalite AR-18 that has a short-stroke gas system, the prototype unveiled in 1975 showed a rifle that is heavily influenced by the AR-15 family of rifles, albeit with modified iron sights, a reshaped stock, and redesigned handguards. The designated number '65' refers to the Year 65 of Republic of China (1976), the year the rifle's design was finalized. Upgraded versions were designated the Type 65K2 and Type 65K3.

The T65 series served as the standard issue weapon for front-line usage of the army and the marine corps until being replaced by the follow-on T91 in the early 2000s. T65 rifles are currently used by the Army Reserves, Army Basic Training Centers, Air Force  and the National Police Agency.

History
The T65 assault rifle was developed at the Taiwan State Arsenal to replace the obsolete 7.62mm M14 rifles imported from the United States. Reports on the original T65 rifle suggested that it performed poorly, but was later improved and became the T65K2 (also referred to as the T68). Later on, a T86 carbine was developed, very similar in appearance to the US-made M4 carbine although using the piston-type gas action of T65. The last weapon in the series is the T91 carbine, which can be described as a T86 with the carrying handle replaced by a Picatinny-type accessory rail.

The T65 assault rifle is a gas operated, select fire rifle. It uses an AR-15 style two-part aluminum receiver and similar rotating bolt action, although the gas system is a short-stroke gas piston, compared with the AR-15's direct gas impingement system. The piston is located above the barrel and concealed within the handguards. The T65 design replaced the carrying handle of M16 pattern rifles with a rear sight block. The carrying handle returned with the T65K2 (but was removable on the T91 carbine). The T65 uses magazines compatible with AR-15 pattern rifles.

The T65 assault rifle is the first 5.56×45mm NATO rifle adopted by the Taiwanese military, with the project starting in 1968. The design sought to improve the AR-15 design by replacing the direct impingement system with a short stroke gas piston, improving the reliability of the rifle.

The T65 has a fire selector with three positions: safe, semiautomatic and fully automatic. It takes standard STANAG magazines, and the piston has its own spring recovery. After firing the gas following the bullet pushes the piston towards the receiver, it connects with the front of the bolt carrier, and the bolt carrier is driven back by inertia. The bolt itself is near identical to an AR-15.

Variants
 T65
 T65K1
 T65K2
T65K2 Carbine
 T65K3

Users

 
 
 
 
 : Used by Haitian police.
 
 
 
 
 
  Former Rifle of the defunct Panama Defense Forces

See also
 T86 assault rifle
 XT-97 Assault Rifle

References

External links

Modern Firearms - T65, T86 and T91 assault rifle (Taiwan)

5.56×45mm NATO assault rifles
Short stroke piston firearms
Firearms of the Republic of China
ArmaLite AR-10 derivatives
AR-15 style rifles
Weapons and ammunition introduced in 1976